MATK, and its various capitalization versions, may refer to:
 MATK or Megakaryocyte-associated tyrosine kinase, a human gene
 matK or Maturase K, a plastid plant gene
 Matk Cirque, an Alpine glacial valley in Slovenia
Main Khiladi Tu Anari, a 1994 Indian film